Gerald is a given name.

Gerald may also refer to:

People
 Gerald (given name), people with the given name
 Gerald of Wales
 Saint Gerald (disambiguation), several saints

Fictional characters
 Gerald Johanssen, fictional character in the Nickelodeon animated television series Hey Arnold!
 Gerald Robotnik, fictional character in the Sonic the Hedgehog video game series
 Gerald (wrestler), one of the Harris Brothers

Places
 Gerald, Alabama
 Gerald, Illinois
 Gerald, Indiana
 Gerald, Missouri, a city
 Gerald, Ohio
 Gerald, Oklahoma (historical)
 Gerald, Saskatchewan, a Canadian village
 Gerald, Texas, former name of the town of Ponder, Texas
 Gerald, Texas (historical), a former US village near Leroy, Texas

Other uses
 Gerald (film), a 2010 American film
 The Gerald, the Premier Service train between Holyhead and Cardiff

ca:Gerard
de:Gerald
es:Gerardo
fr:Gérard (prénom)
hu:Gellért
it:Gerardo
nl:Gerard
nds:Gerke
pl:Gerard
ru:Герхард
sv:Gerhard